Princess Odette can refer to: 

 the principal role in the ballet Swan Lake
 the principal female character in the animated film The Swan Princess

See also 
 Odette (disambiguation)